The SGB-SMIT Group is a manufacturer of power transformers going back to 1913. The company is headquartered in Regensburg, Germany and has production sites and branches in 20 countries. In 2017 the company was acquired by One Equity Partners.

Company’s history
The SGB-SMIT Group came into being in 2000, when the transformer factory SMIT in Nijmegen, founded by Willem Smit in 1913, joined the SGB Group. At that time, the SGB Group, which emerged from Starkstrom-Gerätebau GmbH/Regensburg in 1947, was a subsidiary of the RWE Group.

In 2004, the SGB-SMIT Group was sold by RWE to the financial investor HCP Capital Group. In 2008, it was taken over by BC Partners who sold it in 2017 to One Equity Partners.

In April 2012 SGB-SMIT Group took over OTC Services in Louisville/Ohio, a specialist in repair and upgrading of power transformers. OTC will enhance the business of the Group in North America regarding maintenance and repair of small- and medium-sized power transformers.

In November 2014 SGB-SMIT Group expanded by integrating two new members: the Romanian transformer manufacturer RETRASIB from Sibiu and the transformer design company TRAFO PROIECT from Bucharest. With this addition, the group positioned itself to address the markets in Eastern Europe. At the same time, SGB-SMIT Group thus strengthened their product portfolio in the range around 200 MVA.

In 2017 three new subsidiaries were established on two continents. These are SGB Czech Trafo in Olomouc, Czech Republic (cast resin transformers for standard applications up to 2,500 kVA), SGB Transformers India in Chennai, India (cast resin transformers) and SGB China in Yancheng (also cast resin transformers).

2018 will see the acquisition of Powertech Transformers in South Africa, subsequently renamed SGB-SMIT Power Matla, which produces medium-power and large transformers in Pretoria and distribution transformers in Cape Town. In Fontenay-le-Comte, France, BCV Technologies, which specializes in small and medium-power transformers and special equipment, was acquired.

Products
The company’s range of products extends from large transformers, medium-power transformers, small power transformers, oil distribution transformers and cast-resin transformers via controllable shunt reactors and phase shifters down to Lahmeyer Compact Stations.

The SGB-SMIT Group distributes its products via sales offices and agencies in 42 countries. The company has customers in more than 50 countries.

The Group is managed by Holger Ketterer(CEO)and Dr. Heinrich Uekermann(CFO).

References

External links
sgb-smit.com
wirtschaft-weiss-blau.de

Electrical engineering companies of Germany